Stan Meets Chet is an album by saxophonist Stan Getz with trumpeter Chet Baker, released in 1958 on the Verve label.

Reception

Scott Yanow of AllMusic stated: "Tenor saxophonist Stan Getz and trumpeter Chet Baker never particularly liked each other and, even though they had musically compatible styles, they only worked together briefly in three periods. Their mutual hostility can be felt in subtle ways on this session... even with some good moments, does not live up to its potential."

Track listing
 "I'll Remember April" (Gene de Paul, Patricia Johnston, Don Raye) - 12:24  
 "Autumn in New York/Embraceable You/What's New?" (Vernon Duke/George Gershwin, Ira Gershwin/Bob Haggart, Johnny Burke) - 14:34
 "Jordu" (Duke Jordan) - 8:31
 "Half-Breed Apache" (Ray Noble) - 14:49

Personnel 
Chet Baker — trumpet - except track 3
Stan Getz — tenor saxophone
Jodie Christian - piano
Victor Sproles - bass 
Marshall Thompson - drums

References 

1958 albums
Stan Getz albums
Chet Baker albums
Verve Records albums
Albums produced by Norman Granz